The American Dream is the name of a second album and DVD movie by Mike Jones. It was released through Ice Age Entertainment, Asylum Records and Warner Bros. Records on November 20, 2007. It was originally supposed to be released as an album but was down graded to an EP due to low confidence from the label. The EP includes two songs, "Knock You Down" and "Fuckin' Problems", from Mike Jones' last album Who Is Mike Jones?.

The release date of the album was originally scheduled for numerous releases between November 2006 and late 2007. His third album is called The Voice.

Producers on the album are said to be Salih Williams of Carnival Beats and Myke Diesel.

The album successfully charted on multiple Billboard music charts, having been featured on the Billboard 200, peaking at number 183. It performed considerably better on the Top Rap Albums chart, peaking at number 10, and number 28 on the Top R&B/Hip-Hop Albums chart.

Track listing 
Original EP Tracklist
 "Turning Headz" – 3:11
 "My 64" (featuring Bun B and Snoop Dogg) – 5:11
 "Mr. Jones – 4:00
 "Like What I Got – 3:03
 "Still Tippin'" (featuring Slim Thug and Paul Wall) – 4:32
 "Back Then" – 4:04
 "Shine Cause I Grind (Remix)" (Crime Mob featuring Mike Jones) (Digital Bonus Track) – 4:03
New 2009 Tracklist
 "Turning Heads"
 "Like What I Got"
 "Cutty Buddy" (featuring Twista, T-Pain and Lil Wayne)
 "Swagger Right"
 "Drop & Gimme 50" (featuring Hurricane Chris)
 "Mr. Jones"
 "My 64" (featuring Bun B and Snoop Dogg)
 "Swagg Thru The Roof" (featuring Swole)
 "Next To You" (featuring Nae Nae)
 "I Know" (featuring Trey Songz)
 "Scandalous" (featuring Lil' Bran)
 "Happy Birthday"
 "Houston Oilers"
 "Gimme a Call" (featuring Devin the Dude)
 "On Top Of The Covers"
 "Boi!" (featuring Young Problemz!)
 "Hate On Me"
 "I Got It" (featuring UGK)
 "Boi!" (featuring Young Problemz and Gucci Mane) (Remix iTunes Bonus Track)

References 

2007 EPs
Mike Jones (rapper) albums
Asylum Records albums
Warner Records EPs